Viva Leroy Nash  (September 10, 1915 – February 12, 2010) was an American career criminal and one of the oldest prisoners in history as well as one of those longest incarcerated (for a total of 70 years), spending almost 80 years behind bars. He was the oldest American on death row at the time of his death in February 2010.

Born in Salt Lake City, Utah, Nash spent much of his life in and out of prison for crimes including transporting stolen vehicles, robbery, and attempted murder. He was first imprisoned in 1930 at 15 years old for armed robbery.

In 1947 at 32 years old, he was sentenced to prison again after shooting a Connecticut police officer. He spent almost 25 years behind bars.

In 1977 he was sentenced to life for having murdered postal carrier David J. Woodhurst, but escaped from a prison work crew in 1982, at age 66, where soon after he went into a coin shop in Phoenix, Arizona, and shot an employee dead.

Nash was sentenced to death in 1983. His attorneys claimed that senility had rendered him legally incompetent to be executed, describing him as a "doddering old man, who can't hear, can't see, can't walk, and is very, very loony". The sentence was never carried out; Nash died of natural causes on February 12, 2010, at the age of 94 in the Arizona Eyman State Prison Complex. At the time of his death, he was the oldest person on death row in the US. Sadamichi Hirasawa died on death row in Japan in 1987, nearly one year older with a full 95 years and three months.

See also

 List of United States death row inmates

References

External links
 Profile at the Arizona Department of Corrections
 Archive of handwritten letters from Leroy Nash

1915 births
2010 deaths
People from Salt Lake City
American people convicted of murder
Prisoners sentenced to death by Arizona
American people convicted of attempted murder
American people who died in prison custody
People convicted of murder by Arizona
American prisoners sentenced to death
Prisoners who died in Arizona detention
American escapees
Escapees from Arizona detention
American people convicted of robbery